"Love & Girls" is the seventh Japanese single released by South Korean girl group Girls' Generation on June 19, 2013. The song served as the lead single of the group's third Japanese album Love & Peace.

Background and release
It was announced on April 5, 2013, that Girls' Generation would be releasing their first Japanese single of 2013 on May 29.  The single was released in two versions: a regular edition and a limited edition with a bonus DVD.  The regular edition contains the title track "Love & Girls" and its B-side, "Linguafranca" (Japanese: リンガ・フランカ Ringa furanka).  The bonus DVD contains the music video for "Love & Girls".  It was initially announced that the music video for "Beep Beep", B-side to "Flower Power", would be on the DVD; however, this was later changed. The single was originally scheduled for a May 29, 2013 release, but due to delays in completion of the "Love & Girls" music video, the release was pushed back to June 19, 2013.

Music video
The music video for "Love & Girls" was filmed on April 17, 2013, with selected female members from Girls' Generation's Japanese fan site participating in the choreography. The video was originally scheduled for release on May 29, 2013, with the single but the release got delayed due to some scenes of the video being altered. A dance version of the music video was published by SM Town on YouTube on June 4, 2013. A video compilation of a live performance of the song at Universal Studios Japan on June 19 and various videos of fans performing the shampoo dance choreography was released on June 23, 2013.

Commercial performance
The single rose from number six to number four the day after it debuted on the daily Oricon Singles Chart. The single was able to sell 42,796 physical copies after one week and peaked at number four on the weekly Oricon Singles Chart. "Love and Girls" peaked at number three on the Billboard Japan Hot 100, the Japanese equivalent of the Billboard Hot 100.  It also charted at number four on Billboard Japan's Adult Contemporary Airplay chart, number two on Hot Singles Sales and number twelve on Hot Top Airplay.  In South Korea, "Love & Girls" peaked at number seven on the Gaon International Digital Chart and "Linguafranca" at number 59.

Promotion
On June 19, 2013, the Girls' Generation performed the song for a flash mob of about 4,000 fans at Universal Studios Japan. The girls performed the so-called shampoo dance as part of their choreography which was quickly followed by the crowd present at the show. Fuji Television aired the performance on Mezamashi TV on June 20, 2013. The performance was also included on a video by SM Town on YouTube.

Track listing

Charts

Sales

Release history

References

External links 
 
 

2013 singles
2013 songs
Songs written by Erik Lidbom
South Korean synth-pop songs
Girls' Generation songs
Japanese-language songs
Universal Music Japan singles
SM Entertainment singles